Protein XRP2 is a protein that in humans is encoded by the RP2 gene.

Function 
The RP2 locus has been implicated as one cause of X-linked retinitis pigmentosa. The predicted gene product shows homology with human cofactor C, a protein involved in the ultimate step of beta-tubulin folding. Progressive retinal degeneration may therefore be due to the accumulation of incorrectly-folded photoreceptor or neuron-specific tubulin isoforms, followed by progressive cell death. The RP2 protein is also involved in regulating the function and extension of the outer segment of cone photoreceptors in mice.

References

Further reading